Werner Krammel (born 19 February 1949) is a German former swimmer. He competed in two events at the 1968 Summer Olympics.

References

1949 births
Living people
German male swimmers
Olympic swimmers of West Germany
Swimmers at the 1968 Summer Olympics
Sportspeople from Munich